Pinacosterna weymanni is a species of beetle in the family Cerambycidae. It was described by Quedenfeldt in 1882. It is known from Cameroon, Uganda, the Central African Republic, the Republic of the Congo, the Democratic Republic of the Congo, Angola, and Zambia.

References

Sternotomini
Beetles described in 1882